The Paris International Fantastic Film Festival (PIFFF), was created in 2011 by the Paris Ciné Fantastique association as a venue for horror, thriller and science fiction films.  It takes place in Paris every year in December, and has been recently presented by television station :fr:Ciné+ and Mad Movies magazine. PIFFF has prizes in both feature length and short films. The most recent festival in December 2018 showed 26 films over 8 days and attracted over 10,000 attendees, making it one of the largest film festivals in the city of Paris.

MovieMaker magazine called the festival an "international platform for promising new talent." The festival is held at the historic Max Linder Panorama theater in Paris. The 2018 festival was periodically interrupted by the Yellow Vest gilets jaunes riots that marched by while the festival was in progress.

Winners of the Golden Eye for Best Film

Other genre film festivals
 Sitges Film Festival
 Fantasporto
 Fantasia International Film Festival
 Fantastic Fest
 Screamfest Horror Film Festival
 Puchon International Fantastic Film Festival
 Dead by Dawn
 Fantafestival
 International Horror and Sci-Fi Film Festival
 New York City Horror Film Festival
 Toronto After Dark Film Festival
 TromaDance
 Brussels International Fantastic Film Festival

References

External links

Paris International Fantastic Film Festival page in French at fr.wikipedia.org
Paris International Fantastic Film Festival at the Internet Movie Database

Film festivals in Paris
Fantasy and horror film festivals
Film festivals established in 2011
Winter events in Belgium
Science fiction film festivals